Diganta Barman (born 26 November 1964) is an Indian politician member of Indian National Congress from Assam. He is a MLA, elected from the Barkhetry constituency in the 2021 Assam Legislative Assembly election.

Early life and education 
Diganta Barman was born on 26 November 1964 to Bhumidhar Barman and Malati Barman. His father was a former Chief Minister who also served as Member of Assam Legislative Assembly for Barkhetry. He has 3 sisters.  He completed his graduation in Bachelor of Arts (Political Science) from Gauhati University in the year 1987. He married Kasturi Bharali who is an ACS officer and is currently the Director of Employment and Craftsman of Assam. He has 3 daughters namely Kamakshi Barman, Bhargaavii Barman and Rijuta Barman. He himself is a former ACS officer.

Politicial career 
Barman was the Indian National Congress candidate for Member of Assam Legislative Assembly for Barkhetry in 2016. He lost to the Bharatiya Janata party’s choice Narayan Deka, Barman got 60,610 while Deka got 69,223 votes in 2016. However in 2021, he defeated Deka and became the Member of Assam Legislative Assembly for Barkhetry getting 85,826 votes while Deka got 81,772 votes.

References 

Indian National Congress politicians from Assam
Living people
People from Nalbari district
Assam MLAs 2021–2026
1964 births